Juan Ricondo Vallejo (15 January 1985) better known as Juan Ricondo is a Spanish singer, songwriter and actor. His debut album An American Affair was released in October 2015. It was recorded in Los Angeles and produced by JD Salbego and Sean Hamilton. In August 2019, He won the "People's Choice Awards" at the New Wave competition in Sochi.

Early life
Juan Ricondo was born on 15 January 1985 in Santander, Spain. Ricondo is the first artist of his family, He is the oldest of two brothers and since he was young he dreamed of being an artist. He went to the law school and graduated at the University of Cantabria, at the same time he was studying acting at the local school of acting in Santander (Palacio de Festivales de Cantabria). Soon after, he moved to Madrid to continue his acting studies at the "Chekhov Theatre School". He worked in all kinds of jobs while he was auditioning for films and TV shows. He got a small role in the television show Ugly Betty, He also started singing with the local bands in clubs and pubs of Madrid and writing his first songs which was published on Myspace.

Career
In 2005, he received a scholarship from his hometown, to study at the Lee Strasberg Theatre and Film Institute in New York City. He then found interest listening to artist like Frank Sinatra, Tony Bennett, Dinah Washington and soon after he formed a band and started playing in local clubs across Manhattan. At the Acting school, one of his teacher Paul Calderon suggested him to dedicate professionally into music. Soon he discovered that music was what he really wanted to do. One of his vocal teacher was Gary Catona,.
In 2011 he participates as a guest performing artist at the German beauty contest, Miss Germany 2011. In 2018 Ricondo presented "The J.R Show, A Hollywood Story" at the "Teatro Calderon" in Madrid. A tour-show inspired by the American T.V. shows from the 60s.

Discography

Studio albums

Singles

Honors and awards

New Wave Music Festival
The New Wave (competition) is an annual international television competition held in Sochi.

Tours
   The J.R Show. A Hollywood Story Tour (2018)

Filmography

T.V Shows

T.V appearances
 Antena3 (2015) – Interview
 Telemundo Acceso Total (2016) – Guest Artist
 Fashion TV Moscow (2019) – Interview 
 New Wave (competition) (2019) – Guest Artist

References

External links
 

Living people
1985 births
Latin R&B singers
21st-century Spanish singers